Horia Ispaș (born 9 October 1960) is a Romanian sailor. He competed in the Laser event at the 1996 Summer Olympics.

References

External links
 

1960 births
Living people
Romanian male sailors (sport)
Olympic sailors of Romania
Sailors at the 1996 Summer Olympics – Laser
Place of birth missing (living people)